BVV Barendrecht  is a football club from Barendrecht, Netherlands. The club was founded on 12 February 1926 and plays its matches at Sportpark de Bongerd. With more than 2000 members, Barendrecht is one of the largest amateur clubs of the Netherlands in membership.

History

2010s: Derde and Tweede Divisie
The club has played in the Topklasse since the inauguration in 2010 until 2016, by which time the league was already known as Derde Divisie. From 2016 until 2019 the club played in the Tweede Divisie. In 2018 Barendrecht was managed by Albert van der Dussen who was let go and replaced in January 2019 by Jack van den Berg. Finishing dead last in the Tweede Divisie it automatically relegated to the Derde.

Current squad 
As of 25 January 2020

Competition results

1961–2010

Since 2010

Chief coach
  Daan den Bleijker (1973–?)
  Sándor Popovics (1978–1980)
  Ronald Klinkerberg (1997–2001)
  Jack van den Berg (2006–2015),
  Adrie Poldervaart (2015–2018)
  Jack van den Berg (1/2019–2020)
  Richard Elzinga (2020–)

References

External links
 Official site 

 
Football clubs in the Netherlands
Association football clubs established in 1926
1926 establishments in the Netherlands
Football clubs in Barendrecht